Here to Fall is Blacknorth studio's first original short film. Its plot deals with protagonist Amy's attempt to reconnect with her father.

Here To Fall was recognised with a number of awards including the 2012 Darklight Award for Best Animation and the 2012 Don Quixote Prize for Best Animation at the Galway Film Fleadh. Ultimately, it went on to receive a BAFTA nomination for Best Short Animation in 2013. In the same year, it was selected to be shown at a number of festivals, such as: Brooklyn Film Festival, Raindance, Encounters and Foyle Film Festival.

Awards 
 BAFTA: Best Short Animation (Nominee, 2013)
 Galway Film Fleadh: Don Quixote Award (Winner, 2013)
 Raindance Film Festival: Best Animation (Nominee, 2013)
 Darklight Film Festival: Best Animation (Winner, 2012)

References

British animated short films
2010s British films